The 2009 Letran Knights men's basketball team represented Colegio de San Juan de Letran in the 85th season of the National Collegiate Athletic Association in the Philippines. The men's basketball tournament for the school year 2009-10 began on June 27, 2009, and the host school for the season was San Beda College.

The Knights finished the double round-robin eliminations at fourth place with 12 wins against 6 losses. In the Final Four, the Knights, holding a twice-to-beat disadvantage, were eliminated by the defending champions San Beda Red Lions in one game.

Roster 

 Depth chart Depth chart

NCAA Season 85 games results 

Elimination games were played in a double round-robin format. All games were aired on Studio 23.

Source: inboundPASS

Suspensions 
The NCAA Management Committee, led by acting chairman Mr. Frank Gusi of San Sebastian College, announced the suspension of Letran forwards Kristoffer Alas and Jaypee Belencion. After the first round game of Letran and San Beda which resulted in a debris-pelting and bench-clearing incident, Letran's Kris Alas pushed San Beda center Sudan Daniel right after the endgame buzzer, while Belencion was sacked after he taunted the fans which the league considered as mitigating circumstances.

The league also gave a stern warning to Letran head coach Louie Alas, his assistant Mel Alas, and Letran shooting guard Kevin Alas for their misconduct.

Injuries 
Letran star forward Rey Guevarra tore his anterior cruciate ligament (ACL) when he took a bad fall after colliding against San Beda center Sudan Daniel in the dying seconds of the second-round encounter between the Knights and Red Lions.

Awards

References 

Letran Knights basketball team seasons